Soof is a 2013 Dutch comedy film directed by Antoinette Beumer.

Cast 
 Lies Visschedijk as Soof
 Fedja van Huêt as Kasper
 Dan Karaty as Jim 
  as Sascha
 Anneke Blok as Hansje
 Chantal Janzen as Bob
  as Harm Jan
  as Jan Jaap
 Maryam Hassouni as Najat
  as Gaby
  as Gerrit

See also 
 Soof 3 (2022 film)

References

External links 

2013 comedy films
2013 films
Dutch comedy films
2010s Dutch-language films